Jinshan District is a rural district on the coast in northern New Taipei, Taiwan. The district draws many visitors each year because of its hot springs and its proximity to Chin Pao San and the Ju Ming Museum. The district is home to the Dharma Drum Buddhist College, an institution of higher learning founded by Dharma Drum Mountain monastics devoted to the principles of Zen Buddhism.

Name Origin
This area was originally a Ketagalan settlement, called "Ki-ppare" (Basay: Quimourije), meaning "bumper harvest". This was later adapted as Kimpauli (金包里), the choice of characters perhaps influenced by the discovery of golden dust in the Sulfur creeks. In 1920 during Japanese rule, the area was renamed Kanayama Village (金山庄), Kīrun District (基隆郡), Taihoku Prefecture.

Qingshui Wetland 
Adjacent to Jinshan town at the north-west is a lowland wetland formed by alluvial deposits from Sulphur Creek (磺溪), Xishi Creek (西勢溪) and Qingshui Creek (清水溪). It is the last resting point in Taiwan for many migratory birds heading north during Spring and the first in the country for those heading south during Autumn. It has also served as habitat for rare vagrants such as the critically endangered Siberian Crane (Leucogeranus leucogeranus) and endangered Red-Crowned Crane (Grus japonensis).

Geography
 Area: 49.21 km2
 Population: 20,546 people (February 2023)

Education
 Jinshan Senior High School (grades 7-12)
 Jinshan Elementary School
 Zhongjiao National Elementary School
 Sanhe National Elementary School
 Jinmeimin Elementary School

Tourist attractions
 Chin Pao San
 Ju Ming Museum
 Twin Candlestick Islets
 Yangmingshan National Park

Notable natives
 Lee Hong-chi, actor

See also
 New Taipei

References

External links

  

Districts of New Taipei